Bird cherry is a common name for the European plant Prunus padus.

Bird cherry may also refer to:
 Prunus subg. Padus, a group of species closely related to Prunus padus
 Prunus avium, the cultivated cherry, with the Latin epithet "avium" meaning "bird"
 Prunus pensylvanica, native to North America